Yudit Pumariega de León (19 February 1991 - 1 August 2013) was a Cuban volleyball player. She was part of the Cuba women's national volleyball team.

She participated in the 2010 FIVB Volleyball Women's World Championship. She played with Cienfuegos.

She died in a car accident on 1 August 2013.

Clubs
  Cienfuegos (2010)

References

External links
http://www.volleywood.net/volleyball-related-news/volleyball-news-north-america/rip-yudit-pumariega-de-leon/
http://www.cev.lu/Competition-Area/PlayerDetails.aspx?TeamID=8035&PlayerID=46957&ID=571

1991 births
2013 deaths
Cuban women's volleyball players
Place of birth missing
21st-century Cuban women